David Turpin may refer to:

 David Allen Turpin, an American convicted with his wife for child abuse in the Turpin case
 David H. Turpin (born 1956), Canadian scholar and president and vice-chancellor of the University of Alberta
 David L. Turpin, American orthodontist